Tyron Owusu (born 8 June 2003) is a Swiss professional footballer who plays as a midfielder for Swiss club Luzern.

Personal life
Owusu is the son of the retired Ghana international Owusu Benson.

Career statistics

Club

Notes

References

2003 births
Living people
Swiss men's footballers
Switzerland youth international footballers
Swiss people of Ghanaian descent
Association football midfielders
Swiss Super League players
FC Luzern players
Sportspeople from Lucerne